Zhang Ronghui (born 25 August 1970) is a Chinese sport shooter who competed in the 1992 Summer Olympics.

References

1970 births
Living people
Chinese male sport shooters
Running target shooters
Olympic shooters of China
Shooters at the 1992 Summer Olympics
Shooters at the 1990 Asian Games
Asian Games medalists in shooting
Asian Games gold medalists for China
Asian Games bronze medalists for China
Medalists at the 1990 Asian Games
20th-century Chinese people